Peter Henry Tuipulotu (born February 20, 1969 in Nukualofa, Tonga) was a player of Canadian and American football. He played as a running back at Brigham Young University from 1988 to 1991. He played one season for the San Diego Chargers in 1992, and two for the Baltimore Stallions of the Canadian Football League, from 1994 to 1995. With the Stallions, he won the 83rd Grey Cup.

High School and College Career
Tuipulotu attended Brigham Young University from 1988-1991. He is currently 10th all time in rushing with 1,528 yards in 4 years.

Was Peninsula Athletic League offensive player of the year in 1985 and 1986 as well as All San Mateo County in the same years. Tuipulotu's older brother Tom attended BYU from 1984–85, 1987.

References

1969 births
Living people
American football running backs
Canadian football running backs
San Diego Chargers players
Baltimore Stallions players
BYU Cougars football players
Tongan players of American football
Tongan emigrants to the United States
People from Nukuʻalofa
People from San Mateo, California